Musa Sinan Yılmazer (born 31 January 1987) is a Turkish footballer who plays for Gümüşhanespor.

References

External links

1987 births
Living people
Turkish footballers
Sportspeople from Adapazarı
Samsunspor footballers
Süper Lig players
TFF First League players
Yeni Malatyaspor footballers

Association football midfielders